The 2011–12 Casa Sports season, were in the top division of Senegalese football.  They would win their only championship title.  They would be placed second in Group B with 25 points, 7 wins and 15 goals, they would win the finals stage with 11 points, 3 wins and five goals scored.  They would participate in the 2013 CAF Champions League the following season.

The highest points scored were two matches with two goals, both against Niarry-Tally.

Ligue 1
Casa Sport participated in Group B during the 2011-12 season.

Second and final phase

Match dates not available
Casa Sports participated in Group B during the 2011-12 season.

Home matches:
Casa Sport - Djambars 0-2
Casa Sport - Niarry-Tally 2-0
Casa Sport - US Ouakam 0-0

Away matches:
Djambars - Casa Sport 0-1
Niarry-Tally - Casa Sport 0-2
Casa Sport - Ouakam 0-0

CAF Confederation Cup
Casa Sport club played at the 2012 CAF Confederation Cup, they only faced GAMTEL Banjul which made up of the Senegambian cup derby of 2012.  Casa Sport won a goal, then lost to Gamtel, as they had a goal apiece, Casa Sport lost the penalty kicks 3-0 to GAMTEL

Squad

Transfers

Out

Team kit

|

|

|

References

Casa Sports
2011–12 in Senegalese football